Pathrik Westerholm (born 6 January 1992) is a Swedish professional ice hockey player. He is currently playing with Malmö Redhawks of the  Swedish Hockey League (SHL). Westerholm was selected by the Vancouver Canucks in the 6th round (180th overall) of the 2011 NHL Entry Draft.

Playing career
Westerholm made his Swedish Hockey League debut playing with Brynäs IF during the 2014–15 SHL season. Pathrik's twin brother Ponthus is also a professional hockey player.

On 3 May 2017, Westerholm left Brynäs alongside brother Ponthus, and signed a two-year contract with Frölunda HC.

After claiming the Swedish Championship in his final season under contract in 2018–19 season, Westerholm left as a free agent to move to the Finnish Liiga, again alongside Ponthus, agreeing to a one-year deal with Lukko on 8 May 2019.

Awards and honours

References

External links

1992 births
Living people
Brynäs IF players
BIK Karlskoga players
Frölunda HC players
Malmö Redhawks players
Swedish ice hockey forwards
Vancouver Canucks draft picks
People from Karlskrona
Sportspeople from Blekinge County